Emilio Agustín Porro (born 27 May 1996) is an Argentine professional footballer who plays as a defender.

Career
Porro began with All Boys. The 2016–17 campaign saw him make the breakthrough into their senior squad, with Porro appearing for his debut on 26 March 2017 versus Boca Unidos. He scored his first goal during his second appearance, netting the opener of a 2–2 draw with Independiente Rivadavia on 1 April. Forty-five further appearances followed across his opening three campaigns, the latter of which was in Primera B Metropolitana after 2017–18 relegation, before he scored for the second time against Defensores Unidos in February 2019.

In October 2021, Porro moved to All Boys de Santa Rosa.

Career statistics
.

References

External links

1996 births
Living people
Footballers from Buenos Aires
Argentine footballers
Association football defenders
Primera Nacional players
Primera B Metropolitana players
All Boys footballers
Independiente Rivadavia footballers